The Campeonato Carioca Série B2 is the football fourth level of the First Division annual competition among clubs in the state of Rio de Janeiro, Brazil. 

The current version from 2021 of Campeonato Carioca Série B2 is the fourth-highest level. The previous version of the tournament was implemented in 2017 as the third-highest level, replacing the old Série C, which became the state's fourth division.

List of champions

Following is the list with all the champions of the fourth level of Rio de Janeiro and their different nomenclatures over the years.

Segunda Divisão

Segunda Divisão

Série C

Série B2

Titles by team

Teams in bold stills active.

By city

See also
 Campeonato Carioca Série A1
 Campeonato Carioca Série A2
 Campeonato Carioca Série B1
 Campeonato Carioca Série C

References

External links
  FFERJ website
 Third Level champions at RSSSF
 Best Attendances in Campeonato Carioca at RSSSF